Tárik Michel Kedes Boschetti (born 18 February 1993), commonly known as Tárik or Tarik Boschetti, is a Brazilian footballer who plays as a midfielder for Londrina.

Career statistics

Club

Notes

References

1993 births
Living people
Brazilian footballers
Brazilian expatriate footballers
Association football midfielders
Kakkonen players
Campeonato Brasileiro Série C players
Football League (Greece) players
Esporte Clube Juventude players
Sport Club Internacional players
Club Athletico Paranaense players
Associação Ferroviária de Esportes players
FC Osaka players
Borneo F.C. players
FC Honka players
Associação Portuguesa de Desportos players
Ypiranga Futebol Clube players
Platanias F.C. players
Brazilian expatriate sportspeople in Greece
Expatriate footballers in Greece